Tallchief is a surname. Notable people with the surname include:

Maria Tallchief (1925–2013), American ballerina
Marjorie Tallchief (1926–2021), American ballerina